The Gruber Prize for Justice, established in 2001, was one of five international prizes worth US$500,000 awarded by The Peter and Patricia Gruber Foundation, an American non-profit organization.

Recipients were selected by a distinguished panel of international legal experts from nominations received from around the world.

The Gruber Foundation Justice Prize was presented to individuals or organizations for contributions that have advanced the cause of justice as delivered through the legal system. The award was intended to acknowledge individual efforts, as well as to encourage further advancements in the field and progress toward bringing about a fundamentally just world.

Recipients
2011: Barbara Arnwine; Morris Dees; Association for Civil Rights in Israel; Center for Legal and Social Studies ; and Kurdish Human Rights Project
2010: The Honourable Michael Kirby; John Dugard; and the Indian Law Resource Center
2009: Bryan Stevenson, Executive Director of Equal Justice Initiative (EJI), and European Roma Rights Centre (ERRC), an international public interest law organization that combats anti-Romani racism and human rights abuse of Roma in Europe
2008: Judge Thomas Buergenthal and Jerome J. Shestack
2007: Justice Carmen Argibay of Argentina; Judge Carlos Cerda Fernández of Chile; and international lawyer Mónica Feria Tinta of Peru
2006: Aharon Barak, former President of the Supreme Court of Israel
2005: Dato Param Cumaraswamy
2004: Former Chief Justices Arthur Chaskalson and Pius Langa, both of South Africa
2003: Justice Rosalie Silberman Abella and Madame Justice Bertha Wilson, both of Canada
2002: Fali Sam Nariman
2001: Chief Justice Anthony Roy Gubbay and Sternford Moyo

References

External links
Gruber Foundation Web site
Gruber Prizes nomination page
 Facebook page for The Peter and Patricia Gruber Foundation

Human rights awards
Justice
Legal awards